Maleficium may refer to:

 Maleficium (sorcery), a Latin term meaning mischief, or harmful magic
 Maleficium (album), a 1996 album by Swedish heavy metal band Morgana Lefay
 Maleficium, a 2013 EP by American deathcore band Lorna Shore

See also
 Compendium Maleficarum, a 17th-century witch hunter manual
 Malleus Maleficarum, a 15th-century witch hunter manual
 Malefice, a British heavy metal band
 The Malefice, a 2013 album by Chilean extreme metal band Pentagram Chile
 Maléfices, a French horror fiction role-playing game
 Maleficent (disambiguation)